SS Guararema was a Brazilian Cargo ship that collided with  on the Santos bar off Ilha Des Palmas, Brazil while departing Santos in ballast.

Construction 
Guararema was constructed at the Ardrossan Dockyard & Shipbuilding Co. Ltd. shipyard in Ardrossan, United Kingdom. She was completed in 1919 and was named War Avon initially. She served for different countries and companies under different names; until 1939 in which she was sold to Brazilian transport company Empreza Internacional De Transportes, who operated her as Guararema.

She had a 1 x 2 cyl compound engines driving a single screw propeller. The engine was rated at 91 nhp.

Sinking 
On 4 March 1949, Guararema was en route from Santos when she collided with SS Britannia and sank on the Santos bar off Ilha Des Palmas, Brazil. There were no casualties.

References

1918 ships
Ships sunk in collisions
Ships built in Scotland
Ships sunk with no fatalities
Cargo ships
Shipwrecks in the Atlantic Ocean
Maritime incidents in 1949